Reactive carbonyl species (RCS) are molecules with highly reactive carbonyl groups, and often known for their damaging effects on proteins, nucleic acids, and lipids. They are often generated as metabolic products.  Important RCSs include 3-deoxyglucosone, glyoxal, and methylglyoxal.  RCSs react with amines and thiol groups leading to advanced glycation endproducts (AGEs).  AGE's are indicators of diabetes.

Reactive aldehyde species (RASP), such as malondialdehyde and 4-hydroxynonenal, are a subset of RCS that are implicated in a variety of human diseases.

See also 
 Reactive oxygen species
 Reactive sulfur species
 Reactive nitrogen species

References

Molecules
Carbon compounds